Patrick Tilley (4 July 1928 – 25 May 2020) was a British science fiction author best known for The Amtrak Wars series of books – a futureworld epic set on the eve of the fourth millennium in a world emerging from the ravages of a dimly understood global holocaust. The name "Amtrak" – appropriated by a specific group of survivors – is a name remembered from what is called "The Old Time".

Tilley died on 25 May 2020 after a short illness.

Bibliography

The Amtrak Wars 
 Cloud Warrior (1983)
 First Family (1985)
 Iron Master (1987)
 Blood River (1988)
 Death-Bringer (1989)
 Earth-Thunder (1990)

Other novels 
 Fade-Out (1975)
 Mission (1981)
 Xan (1986)
 Star Wartz: Tales of Adventure from the Rimworld  (1995)

References

External links 
 
 

1928 births
2020 deaths
British science fiction writers
British fantasy writers
British male novelists
Alumni of King's College, Newcastle